The 2002 Challenge Cup was the 101st staging of rugby league's oldest knockout competition, the Challenge Cup. Known as the Kellogg's Nutri-Grain Challenge Cup for sponsorship reason, the final was contested by Wigan Warriors and St. Helens at Murrayfield Stadium in Edinburgh. Wigan won the match 21–12.

First round

Second round

Third round

Fourth round

Fifth round

Quarter-finals

Semi finals

Final

References

External links
 Challenge Cup official website
 Challenge Cup 2002 results at Rugby League Project

Challenge Cup
Challenge Cup
Challenge Cup